Varqá (born Mírzá ʻAlí-Muhammad; died 1896) was an eminent follower of Baháʼu'lláh, the founder of the Baháʼí Faith. Varqá was referred to by ʻAbdu'l-Bahá as a Hand of the Cause of God and was identified as one of the nineteen Apostles of Baháʼu'lláh.

Baháʼu'lláh wrote a tablet addressed to Varqá, praising the high station of the King and Beloved of Martyrs.

Execution 

Varqá is well known as the father of Rúhu'lláh. The two of them were the first among a large group to be martyred in 1896 by Persian authorities for being Baháʼís. This story is summarized from Balyuzi's book.

The executioner, Hajibu'd Dawlih, was particularly enraged with his prisoners, and brought out Varqá and Rúhu'lláh into an inner room. Varqá's calm reply to questioning further maddened his captors. The executioner plunged a dagger into the chest of Varqá saying 'How are you?' to which Varqá replied 'Feeling better than you'. Hajibu'd Dawlih then asked him which should die first, him or his son Rúhu'lláh, to which Varqá replied 'It is the same to me.'

Hajibu'd Dawlih and four others then began to tear Varqá apart in front of his son. He made an offer to Rúhu'lláh that he could be adopted, offered an allowance, given a post in the government, but Rúhu'lláh asked to join his father instead. Hajibu'd Dawlih then strangled him with a bastinado. After his dead body fell to the ground, Rúhu'lláh's body raised and then fell to the ground again, a yard away. The experience scared Hajibu'd Dawlih so much that he ran away screaming.

Family 

The second son of Varqá, Valíyu'lláh Varqá, later was appointed a Hand of the Cause by Shoghi Effendi in 1951. When the latter died in 1955, the grandson of Varqá, ʻAlí-Muhammad Varqá was appointed in his place.

References 
 
 

Hands of the Cause
Apostles of Baháʼu'lláh
Iranian Bahá'ís
1896 deaths
Bahá'í martyrs
Year of birth unknown
19th-century Bahá'ís